Kim Jong-seon (born 30 July 1939) is a South Korean basketball player. He competed in the men's tournament at the 1964 Summer Olympics.

References

1939 births
Living people
South Korean men's basketball players
Olympic basketball players of South Korea
Basketball players at the 1964 Summer Olympics
Place of birth missing (living people)